Glenn Elliott may refer to:

Glenn Elliott (footballer) (born 1950), former Australian rules footballer
Glenn Elliott (baseball) (1919–1969), former Boston Braves pitcher